Master Swordsman Lu Xiaofeng is a television series adapted from Gu Long's Lu Xiaofeng novel series. The series was first broadcast in early 2001. Its sequel, Master Swordsman Lu Xiaofeng 2, was released in June 2001.

Cast
 Jimmy Lin as Lu Xiaofeng
 Christopher Lee as Ximen Chuixue
 Thomas Ong as Hua Manlou
 Kristy Yang as Sha Man
 Max Mok as Truthful Monk
 Qi Yuwu as Sikong Zhaixing
 Jacelyn Tay as Gongsun Daniang / Niuroutang
 Constance Song as Lady Boss
 Wu Hsing-kuo as Ye Gucheng
 Theresa Lee as Shangguan Feiyan
 Tao Hong as Ouyang Qing
 Fang Jiwei as Sun Xiuqing
 Zheng Geping as Gong Jiu

External links

2001 Singaporean television series debuts
2001 Singaporean television series endings
Singaporean wuxia television series
Works based on Lu Xiaofeng (novel series)
Taiwanese wuxia television series
Chinese wuxia television series
Singaporean television co-productions
Television shows based on works by Gu Long
Channel 8 (Singapore) original programming